Cheshmeh Chai, also rendered as  Cheshmeh Chahi, may refer to:
 Cheshmeh Chai-ye Olya
 Cheshmeh Chai-ye Sofla
 Cheshmeh Chai-ye Vosta